The Lycoming O-540 is a family of air-cooled six-cylinder, horizontally opposed fixed-wing aircraft and helicopter engines of  displacement, manufactured by Lycoming Engines. The engine is a six-cylinder version of the four-cylinder Lycoming O-360.

Design and development

Producing between  these engines are installed in a large variety of aircraft. The main competitors are the Continental IO-520 and IO-550 series.

An AEIO version was developed for high-performance competition aerobatics aircraft. The AEIO-540 family has achieved considerable success in aircraft such as the Extra 300, CAP 232, and Zivko Edge 540.

Variants

All engines have an additional prefix preceding the 540 to indicate the specific configuration of the engine. The numerous engine suffixes denote different accessories such as different manufacturers' carburetors, or different magnetos.

O-540
Standard, direct-drive, normally aspirated Opposed engine, equipped with a carburetor

IO-540
Normally aspirated engine with fuel Injection

AEIO-540
Normally aspirated engine with fuel injection and inverted lubrication for Aerobatic use

TIO-540
Turbocharged and fuel-injected

TEO-540

LTIO-540
Left-hand (opposite-direction) rotation, turbocharged, fuel-injected; used as the right-hand engine on Piper PA-31-325 Navajo C/Rs and Piper PA-31-350 Chieftains to prevent critical engine control issues, and used for the left side of the Aerostar 700P

IGO-540
Gearbox at the front end of the crankshaft to drive the propeller at fewer revolutions per minute than the engine, normally aspirated with fuel injection, dry sump engine built specifically for the Aero Commander 560F

TIGO-540
Turbo-charged, injected and geared

IGSO-540
Supercharger driven by the engine, gearbox to drive propeller, and fuel injection (up to )

VO-540
Vertically mounted engine for use in a helicopter, normally aspirated and equipped with a carburetor

IVO-540
Normally aspirated engine with fuel injection, mounted vertically for use in a helicopter

TVO-540
Turbocharged engine equipped with a carburetor, mounted vertically for use in a helicopter

TIVO-540
Turbocharged engine with fuel injection, mounted vertically for use in a helicopter

HIO-540
Helicopter engine mounted horizontally as in fixed-wing aircraft, normally aspirated with fuel injection; not used in any fixed-wing aircraft

TIO-541
Same as a TIO-540, except the "1" indicates an integral accessory drive

TIGO-541
Same as a TIGO-540, except the "1" indicates an integral accessory drive

Applications

Specifications (IO-540-K1A5)

See also

References

External links

 540 Series homepage at Lycoming.com

Boxer engines
O-540
1950s aircraft piston engines